The Australian Rugby League Hall of Fame honours players who have shown exceptional skill at rugby league, all-time great coaches and referees, and other major contributors to the game who are Australian. 

It was officially established in 2002, to honour the many past greats of the game, who have played in the New South Wales/Sydney league competition, Australian rugby league competition, Super League competition and the National Rugby League.

The first batch of players were inducted to the hall of fame in 2002 including legends of the sport such as Reg Gasnier, Johnny Raper and Wally Lewis. In 2003 another six members were added to the elite club, with six more added in 2004, 2005 and 2006. In 2007 there were three more inductees: three from pre-1940 and three from post World War II.
There were thirty-five members of the Australian Rugby League Hall of Fame up to the end of 2007.

In 2018 the ARL took control of the concept of The Immortals, an accolade till that point administered by Rugby League Week. The ARL clarified the protocols of Immortal induction and the interplay with the Hall of Fame. It was confirmed that Immortals would continue to be inducted rarely & occasionally and would be selected from the overall pool of the Rugby League Hall of Fame. Inductees for the Hall of Fame would occur regularly - perhaps every year - with six new inductees in 2018. It was also confirmed that the 65 members of the NRL's Team of the Century (selected during the 2008 century celebrations) who were not in the Hall of Fame as at 2007, were all to be entered to the Hall of Fame. Effectively 65 players who had been selected for honour in 2008 were added to the Hall of Fame in March 2018; with a further new 6 added in July 2018.

Hall of Fame Members

See also
British Rugby League Hall of Fame
Australian rugby league's 100 greatest players
Australian rugby league team of the century

References

External links
Official website
Hall of Fame History Page

Awards established in 2002
Australian sports trophies and awards
Rugby league museums and halls of fame
Hall of Fame
Halls of fame in Australia
2002 establishments in Australia